Boğaç A. Ergene is an American historian in Islam and world, social theory and cultural studies, currently a professor at University of Vermont, and was previously holder of the Aga Khan Distinguished Professor in Islamic Humanities at Brown University for the 2014 spring semester. He was also co-editor of the Brill Publishers series Ottoman Empire and Its Heritage. He has been collected by libraries.

References

21st-century American historians
American male non-fiction writers
Brown University faculty
University of Vermont faculty
Year of birth missing (living people)
Living people
21st-century American male writers